Season two of Tu Cara me Suena premiered on April 16, 2014. Cacho Castaña and Elizabeth Vernacci returned as judges along with new member of the panel, Enrique Pinti; Marley Wiebe returned as host.

Celebrities
This season increased the number of celebrities from eight to ten. However, two celebrities of the entire cast, Laura Esquivel and Jey Mammon, are competing as a duet and every week of the competition, they will emulate couples. The cast includes actors, comedians and singer from different ages and areas of the Argentine entertainment.

Barbie Velez once replaced Angela Torres because she was sick and couldn't get to the reaharsals.

Scoring chart

Red numbers indicate the lowest score for each week
Green numbers indicate the highest score for each week
 the celebrity eliminated that week

Competitors scores

Main show details

Week 1 (April 16)

Running order

Imitations chart
The following chart contains the names of the iconic singers that the celebrities imitated every week.

Guest celebrities

References

Your Face Sounds Familiar
2014 Argentine television seasons